Rennie Alexander Keith (born 19 August 1971) is a former Scottish cricketer.

Keith was born at Glasgow in August 1971, where he was educated at Kelvinside Academy. A club cricketer for Clydesdale, he was noted as being the most improved cricketer on the Scottish club circuit in 1996. He was later selected to play for Scotland in a List A one-day match against Dorset at Glasgow in the 2nd Round of the 1999 NatWest Trophy, with the Scottish side being described as a "second string". Opening the batting alongside Bryn Lockie, he scored 24 runs before being dismissed by Vyvian Pike; Scotland went on to win the match by 76 runs.

References

External links
 

1971 births
Living people
Cricketers from Glasgow
People educated at Kelvinside Academy
Scottish cricketers